Ectoedemia sporadopa is a moth of the family Nepticulidae. It was described by Edward Meyrick in 1911. It is known from Sri Lanka.

This species has a wingspan of 5 mm. The forewings are whitish ochreous, sprinkled with dark fuscous.

References

Nepticulidae
Moths described in 1911
Moths of Asia